Timaea is a genus of moths belonging to the family Tineidae.

There is presently only one species in this genus, Timaea bivittatella Walker, 1863 that is known from Australia.

References

Myrmecozelinae
Monotypic moth genera